Virendra Kumar Khatik (born 27 February 1954) is an Indian politician serving as the Minister of Social Justice and Empowerment. He is a Member of Parliament in the 17th Lok Sabha from Tikamgarh.

He was also the chairperson of the Standing Committee on Labour and a Member of the General Purpose Committee. He was chosen as the Pro-tem speaker of the 17th Lok Sabha in June 2019.

Personal life
Khatik was born in Sagar, Madhya Pradesh on 27 February 1954. From fifth standard onwards, he studied at sagar and did his higher studies at Dr. Hari Singh Gour University, from where he did his PhD in 2007. 

He is married to Kamal Khatik with whom he has a son and a daughter. Former cabinet minister Gauri Shankar Shejwar is his brother-in-law.

Political career

In the 11th, 12th, 13th, and 14th Lok Sabha, he represented the Sagar constituency of Madhya Pradesh between 1996 and 2009. In the 15th, 16th, and 17th Lok Sabha, he represented the Tikamgarh constituency of Madhya Pradesh. He held different posts in Rashtriya Swayamsevak Sangh (RSS), Akhil Bharatiya Vidyarthi Parishad (ABVP), and the political party Bharatiya Janata Party (BJP).

He became Minister of Social Justice and Empowerment in Second Modi ministry when cabinet overhaul happened.

External links
 Members of Fourteenth Lok Sabha - Parliament of India website

References

Living people
1954 births
Bharatiya Janata Party politicians from Madhya Pradesh
Narendra Modi ministry
People from Sagar, Madhya Pradesh
People from Tikamgarh district
Lok Sabha members from Madhya Pradesh
India MPs 2004–2009
India MPs 1996–1997
India MPs 1998–1999
India MPs 1999–2004
India MPs 2009–2014
India MPs 2014–2019
Pro tem Speakers of the Lok Sabha